Gianluca Castellini del Pozzo (died 1510) was a Roman Catholic prelate who served as Bishop of Reggio Emilia (1508–1510).

Biography
On 8 March 1503, Gianluca Castellini was appointed during the papacy of Pope Alexander VI as Coadjutor Bishop of Reggio Emilia.
On 7 January 1508, he succeeded to the chair. He served as Bishop of Reggio Emilia until his death in 1510.

References

External links and additional sources
 (for Chronology of Bishops) 
 (for Chronology of Bishops) 

16th-century Italian Roman Catholic bishops
Bishops appointed by Pope Alexander VI
1510 deaths